The 24th World Science Fiction Convention (Worldcon), also known as Tricon, was held on 1–5 September 1966 at the Sheraton-Cleveland in Cleveland, Ohio, United States. Officially, the convention was hosted by three cities in the region: Cincinnati, Ohio, Cleveland, Ohio, and Detroit, Michigan; hence the name "Tricon".

The three co-chairmen of that Worldcon each represented their city's fandom; they were Ben Jason of Cleveland, Howard DeVore of Detroit, and Lou Tabakow of Cincinnati.

Participants 

Attendance was approximately 850.

Guests of Honor 

 L. Sprague de Camp
 Isaac Asimov (toastmaster)

Programming and events 

At the convention, Gene Roddenberry premiered both pilot episodes, "The Cage" and "Where No Man Has Gone Before", for his upcoming NBC TV series Star Trek.

Awards

1966 Hugo Awards 

 Best Novel (tie):
 ...And Call Me Conrad by Roger Zelazny
 Dune by Frank Herbert
 Best Short Fiction: "'Repent, Harlequin!' Said the Ticktockman" by Harlan Ellison
 Best Professional Artist: Frank Frazetta
 Best Professional Magazine: if
 Best Amateur Magazine: ERB-dom edited by Camille Cazedessus, Jr.
 Best All-Time Series: the Foundation series by Isaac Asimov

See also 

 Hugo Award
 Science fiction
 Speculative fiction
 World Science Fiction Society
 Worldcon

References

External links 

 NESFA.org: The Long List
 NESFA.org: 1966 convention notes 

1966 conferences
1966 in Ohio
1966 in the United States
Science fiction conventions in the United States
Worldcon